Bury the Light is the fourth studio album by American power metal band Pharaoh, released on February 24, 2012 in Europe, and on March 6 in the United States via Cruz Del Sur Music. It features guest solos by Mike Wead (King Diamond) and Jim Dofka.

Track listing

Reception

Personnel 
 Tim Aymar - vocals
 Chris Kerns - bass
 Matt Johnsen - electric guitar
 Chris Black - drums

References 

Pharaoh (band) albums
2012 albums
Albums with cover art by Jean-Pascal Fournier